John Wilson, DL (1837 – 5 January 1928) was a Liberal Unionist Party politician in Scotland.  He was Member of Parliament (MP) for Glasgow St. Rollox from 1900 to 1906.

He was a deputy lieutenant of Stirlingshire from 17 March 1902.

References

External links 
 

1837 births
1928 deaths
Members of the Parliament of the United Kingdom for Glasgow constituencies
UK MPs 1900–1906
Deputy Lieutenants of Stirlingshire
Liberal Unionist Party MPs for Scottish constituencies